Cuzco (pronounced:  KUZ-co) is an unincorporated community in Columbia Township, Dubois County, in the U.S. state of Indiana.

History
Cuzco was platted in 1905 by William H. Nicholson. It was named after Cusco, in Peru. A post office was established at Cuzco in 1902, and remained in operation until it was discontinued in 1955.

Civil War historian Gilbert R. Tredway was reared in Cuzco during the 1920s and 1930s.

Geography

References

External links

Unincorporated communities in Dubois County, Indiana
Unincorporated communities in Indiana
Jasper, Indiana micropolitan area
1905 establishments in Indiana
Populated places established in 1905